XHLM-FM is a radio station on 105.9 FM in Tuxtla Gutiérrez, Chiapas, Mexico. The station is owned by Organización Radiofónica Mexicana and is known as Radio Zoque.

History

XELM-AM 1240 received its concession on November 30, 1964. It was owned by Radio Chiapas, S.A. and broadcast with 1,000 watts day and 250 night. The station later boost its nighttime power to 1,000 watts, the last change before the AM-FM migration.

On February 15, 2021 "Romántica" changed its frequency to 99.3 MHz, replacing its sister station "Radio Zoque".

References

Radio stations in Chiapas
Radio stations established in 1964